Vincenzo "Cento" Perruchon (8 January 1921 – 29 June 2005) was an Italian cross-country skier who competed in the 1940s and in the early 1950s. He was born in Cogne.

In 1948 he was a member of the Italian relay team which finished sixth in the 4x10 km relay competition. In the 18 km event he finished 54th. Four years later he was again part of the Italian relay team which finished sixth in the 4x10 km relay competition.

Further notable results
 1946: 2nd, Italian men's championships of cross-country skiing, 18 km classic
 1947: 1st, Italian men's championships of cross-country skiing, 18 km classic
 1949: 2nd, Italian men's championships of cross-country skiing, 18 km classic
 1950: 2nd, Italian men's championships of cross-country skiing, 18 km classic
 1951: 2nd, Italian men's championships of cross-country skiing, 18 km classic
 1954: 1st, Italian men's championships of cross-country skiing, 15 km classic

References

External links
 
Wallechinsky, David. (1984). The Complete Book of the Olympics: 1896-1980. "4x10-kilometer relay". New York: Penguin Books. p. 617.
Vincenzo Perruchon's obituary 

1921 births
2005 deaths
Italian male cross-country skiers
Olympic cross-country skiers of Italy
Cross-country skiers at the 1948 Winter Olympics
Cross-country skiers at the 1952 Winter Olympics